Shelby Tucker (James Shelby Tucker Jr.) was a dual-national American and British lawyer and journalist, and the author of: (1) Among Insurgents: Walking Through Burma, the story of his trek from China to India through the Kachin highlands of northern Burma; (2) Burma: The Curse of Independence, a 'plain man's guide' to Burma's perennial strife; (3) The Last Banana: Dancing with the Watu, about David Livingstone's quest for 'God's highway', the role of the Greeks in bringing the 'three Cs' (commerce, Christianity and civilization) to Tanganyika, and Tucker's African travels; (4) Client Service, a satirical novel about an offshore financial company, drawn from a moment in the sixties when Tucker was a 'financial counsellor' for Bernie Cornfeld's notorious Investors Overseas Services; and (5) (jointly with Ilona Gruber Drivdal) Poetry and Thinking of the Chagga, a translation of a German missionary's study of the beliefs and customs of the Chagga peoples of German East Africa that had been published in 1909.

Early years
Tucker was born on 1 March 1935 in Ripley, Tennessee,(5) the eldest son of James Shelby Tucker and Louise Nowlin Tucker, and educated at Saint Stanislaus College (Bay St. Louis MS), East High School (Memphis TN), Phillips Academy, Andover, Yale University, Corpus Christi College, Oxford University and Tulane Law School.(6) He was called to the bar in Louisiana and New York(7) and admitted to practice before the Fifth, Second and Eleventh United States Circuit Courts of Appeal and the United States Supreme Court. He has practiced law in London, New York City, New Orleans, Wellington, New Zealand and Perth, Western Australia. In Zanzibar in 1976 he married Carole Shelby Carnes, a distant cousin. Acting for his wife in Tucker v. Summers, he changed the rules governing admission of foreign-trained lawyers to the Louisiana bar.(8).  He is the half-brother of Bruen Tucker, a distinguished member of the Oregon Society of CPA and accomplished golfer with an almost trusted handicap of 5.

Travels
Tucker expounded his passion for travel in an interview for the Andover Bulletin: 'Spanish has an expression for monomania. "Cada loco tiene su tema" —every lunatic has his theme. Mine, for most of my life, has been the open road, wherever it leads.'(9) When he was 17, he left his father asleep in their hotel room in Shreveport and hitchhiked to the Pacific coast and on to Yellowstone Park, Salt Lake City, Denver, El Paso and Mexico City, returning home after three weeks in time for school.(10) Nine months later, he boarded a tanker as supercargo, sailed to Venezuela and on to Haifa, then hitchhiked around Israel and most of Western Europe.(11) Two summers later, he hitchhiked across North Africa.(12) In 1957, while an undergraduate at Oxford, he attended the VIth World Festival of Youth and Students in Moscow, then travelled through Siberia to Peking, notwithstanding a US government ban on travel there.(13) After leaving Oxford, he hitchhiked to Egypt.(14) In 1960–2, he spent eight months hitchhiking from England to and around the Indian subcontinent,(15) then signed on a freighter bound for New Zealand and hitchhiked through New Zealand, Australia, Indonesia, Malaya, Thailand, Laos, Cambodia and Japan, then signed on a freighter bound for California and hitchhiked to Alaska.(16) He drove from Europe to Saudi Arabia via Turkey, Lebanon, Jordan and Iraq, and returned via Egypt, Libya, Tunisia, Algeria and Morocco in 1965, and two years later hitchhiked from Rio de Janeiro to Buenos Aires, Santiago, La Paz, Cuzco, Machu Picchu, Lima and Bogota, walked along ancient Indian trails through the jungle to Panama, then hitchhiked to Mississippi through Central America and Mexico.(17) In 1967 he made the first of 16 trips to sub-Saharan Africa.(18) In 1972, after the government of Ethiopia closed its border with Sudan, he rode into Metemma on a camel.(19) His honeymoon after his marriage in Zanzibar in 1976, was overlanding back to England via the Nile, Saudi Arabia, Jordan, Syria and Turkey.(20) After hitching around Malawi in 1988, he returned to England via Kenya, Somalia, Djibouti, Yemen, Saudi Arabia, Jordan, Iraq and Turkey.(21) In 1989, the year following his Among Insurgents trek, he trekked around eastern Burma with the Karen National Liberation Army.(22) In 2002, he crossed the Atlantic in a sailboat.(23) He returned to New Zealand in 2006 and Australia in 2007 to hitchhike to places he had not reached in 1961-2(24) and in 2010-11 repeated his 1960 hitchhiking trip through the Middle East and around the Indian subcontinent.(25)

Critics' evaluation

Among Insurgents
Among Insurgents was ranked the top-selling travel hardback in the UK three weeks after its publication.(26) Maggie Gee wrote that it was 'a first book by an unknown author that makes you want to stand up and applaud ... it deserves to become a classic.'(27) A review in the Royal Geographical Society's Geographical Magazine stated: 'It is always dangerous to bandy around words like "classic", but Among Insurgents is a rare treasure ... It is a tale which can only inspire the utmost respect ... '(28) It was Colin Thubron's favourite reading for 2000. He characterized it as an 'astonishing book: a surreal mixture of Boy's Own derring-do and expert knowledge of an almost unknown region'(29) Six national newspapers in the UK selected it for their Best Books of the Year features.(30) Tobias Wolfe said, 'I have seldom been more aware of the line between courage and lunacy.(31) Robert Carver described it as 'a throwback to the heroic age of travel ... the most unusual and distinguished travel book I have read for years(32) and the author as 'the most extraordinary adventurer and original travel writer of the second half of the 20th century. You have to search the heroic age of discovery for his equal – he is a genuine one-off, with no earthly competition.(33) Among Insurgents describes the author's journey into Burma through a border area of China closed to foreigners, through the Shan and Kachin States, and out of Burma via an area of India closed to foreigners. En route, he was detained by Communist insurgents, handed over to Kachin insurgents and arrested by the Indian Army. Among Insurgents also examines the symbiotic relationship between the civil war in Burma and the international drugs trade. The author interviewed growers of opium poppies and leaders on both sides of the narcotics divide, and his report to the US National Security Council may have contributed to Washington's changed perception of the Burmese Army as the main player in the trade. (Google Books) The genius of this ambitious subject',  writes Maggie Gee of Client Service, is all [Tucker's] own, as are his glimpses of the beautiful natural universe against which tiny human beings prance, the sky above them "robin's egg blue turning to silver". This book is a rarity, at once deeply serious and absurdly enjoyable ... Read it now, before the next wave of irrational exuberance drowns us all.

The Last Banana
Echoing that tribute in his review of The Last Banana, Michael Moran stated that the book's author was 'that rare species of travel writer: an authentic adventurer of expansive Victorian self-confidence and Christian moral conviction; a man of uncompromising intellectual standards and fierce loyalty in friendship. This, in an age devoted to contrived "travel experiences", cosmetic celebrity and the adoration of the Golden Calf.(34) Fr Alexander Lucie-Smith wrote that The Last Banana was 'the best book about Africa I have ever read or am ever likely to read.(35)

Other publications
• Peace-loving Plodders, National Review, 14 September 1973
• Click, click, click, Arab News (Jeddah), 16 July 1978
• Zionism – A Closed Company, The Commercial Appeal, Memphis TN, 14 August 1978
• From the Other Side, The Commercial Appeal, Memphis TN, 26 November 1978, 
• Palestinians and Jews, The Times-Picayune, New Orleans, 3 November 1979
• Israel's restraint, The Times-Picayune, New Orleans, 14 August 1981
• In defense of Sandanistas and Nicaragua, The Times-Picayune, New Orleans, 25 March 1985
• Palestine Revisited, New Horizon, 15 October 1988
• book review, Land of Jade: A Journey Through Insurgent Burma by Bertil Lintner, Geographical Magazine, Royal Geographical Society, July 1991
• book review, Searching for Fatima by Ghada Karmi, Financial Times, 28/9 December 2002
• book review, Burma: Political Economy under Military Rule, Robert Taylor (ed.), The Times Literary Supplement, 9 November 2001
• book review, The Heart Must Break: The Fight for Democracy and Truth in Burma by James Mawdsley, Literary Review, November 2001 
• book review, From the Land of Green Ghosts by Pascal Khoo Thwe, The Times Literary Supplement, 21 March 2003
• book review, Haile Selassie's War by Anthony Mockler, Times Literary Supplement, 21 May 2004
• book review, A Question of Zion by Jacqueline Rose and Myths of Zionism by John Rose, appendix Hidden Hands? to Publish it not by Christopher Mayhew & Michael Adams – Signal, 2006
• book review, Wilfred Thesiger: The Great Explorer by Alexander Maitland, The Tablet, 1 April 2006
• book review, First Overland: London¬–Singapore by Land Rover by Tim Slessor, The Tablet, 29 July 2006
• book review, Paradise with Serpents: travels in the lost world of Paraguay by Robert Carver, The Tablet, 23 September 2007
• book review, A Country in the Moon: Travels in the Heart of Poland by Michael Moran, The Spectator, 21 June 2008, https://web.archive.org/web/20100316055926/http://www.spectator.co.uk/books/783056/flying-bison-and-half-a-cup-of-coffee.thtml

Reviews of Among Insurgents: Walking Through Burma
• The Daily Telegraph, 27 May 2000
• The Spectator, 8 July 2000
• The Times Literary Supplement, 28 July 2000
• Traveller, Autumn 2000
• Deccan Chronicle, Hyderabad, 10 September 2000
• The Telegraph, Calcutta, 22 September 2000
• Outlook, New Delhi, 2 October 2000, 
• Business Standard, New Delhi, 16 October 2000
• The Express Magazine, Bombay, 22 October 2000
• McComb Enterprise-Journal, McComb MS, 27 October 2000
• Financial Express, New Delhi, 29 October 2000
• The Best Times, Memphis TN, November 2000
• The Daily Telegraph, 11 November 2000
• The Sunday Telegraph, 26 November 2000
• Sunday Times, 26 November 2000
• The Scotsman, 30 November 2000
• Corpus Christi College Pelican Record, Oxford, December 2000
• Daily Mail, 29 December 2000
• The Statesman, Calcutta, 18 February 2001
• Bulletin of the Burma Studies Group, March 2001
• The Tablet, 5 May 2001
• The Times, 7 July 2001
• National Review Online, 29 July 2001, 
• The Daily Telegraph, 29 September 2001
• Sunday Telegraph, 21 October 2001 
• Geographical Magazine, Royal Geographical Society, November 2001

Reviews of Burma: The Curse of Independence
• Literary Review, November 2001
• Far Eastern Economic Review, Hong Kong, 8 November 2001
• Traveller, Winter 2001/2002
• The Oxford Times, 12 December 2001
• Foreign Affairs, March/April 2002
• Choice, Middletown CN, May 2002
• MultiCultural Review, Westport CN, June 2002
• The Times Literary Supplement, 21 June 2002
• First City, New Delhi, July 2002
• Business Standard, New Delhi, 24 July 2002
• The Statesman, New Delhi, 28 July 2002
• Frontline, Chennai, August 2002
• The Tablet, 2 August 2002, 
• The Sunday Tribune, Chandigarh, 11 August 2002
• The Wall Street Journal, 28 August 2002, 
• The Telegraph, Calcutta, 1 November 2002
• The Hindu, Calcutta, 2 March 2003
• Corpus Christi College Pelican Record, December 2003
• Virginia Consortium of Asian Studies, 2004 Vol. VI
• SOAS Bulletin, Spring 2006

Reviews of The Last Banana
• The Independent, 18 May 2010, 
• Geographer, Royal Scottish Geographical Society, summer 2020
• Church Times, 4 June 2010 
• The Catholic Companion, July 2010
• Delta Magazine, Cleveland MS, July/August 2010
• The Tablet, 22 July 2010. http://www.thetablet.co.uk/review/508
• Good Book Stall, 30 July 2010
• McComb Enterprise-Journal, McComb MS, 5 September 2010
• The Times Literary Supplement, 24 September 2010
• Travel News Kenya, November 2010, 
• Sunday Nation, Nairobi, 28 November 2010

References

External links
 "Debuts with a flavour" from The Indian Express
 "The Handover of Burma" from The Wall Street Journal
 "A gypsy who is at home in India" from Deccan Chronicle
 Interview: Peggy Birch, the Commercial Appeal, 1 July 2010
 Interview: WREC Memphis 2 July 2010
 Fr Alexander Lucie-Smith, Catholic Herald, 30 June 2011
 Interview: Etoile Pindar, Dialogue, Nassau, January 2000,
 
 video/video.php?v=10150414590480394
 video/video.php?v=10150527852555394
 video/video.php?v=10150528378025394
 Deccan Chronicle, Chennai, 23 October 2011
 "No Easy Cures For Burma's Ills" from Far Eastern Economic Review
 overview: The Guardian, 3 June 2000
 interview: Chris Koenig, The Oxford Times, 22 September 2000
 interview: Dave Craton, Andover Bulletin, Winter 2001

Notes

 Deccan Chronicle, Chennai, 23 October 2011,
 http://www.deccanchronicle.com/tabloid/chennai/gypsy-who-home-india-709 
 The Radcliffe Press; Penguin India and White Lotus, 2000; Flamingo, 2001
 Pluto, 2001 and Penguin India, 2002. Con la insurgencia: A pie por Birmania, Melusina, Barcelona, 2006
 Stacey International, 2010
 The Commercial Appeal, 26 November 1978 and 1 July 2010, https://web.archive.org/web/20120302224101/http://blogs.commercialappeal.com/the_shelf_life/2010/07/shelby-tucker-comes-home-with-the-last-banana.html
 https://web.archive.org/web/20120302224101/http://blogs.commercialappeal.com/the_shelf_life/2010/07/shelby-tucker-comes-home-with-the-last-banana.html
 https://www.facebook.com/ video/video.php?v=10150414590480394; The Last Banana; Andover Bulletin, Winter 2001/2002 
 http://lawyers.justia.com/lawyer/james-shelby-tucker-1140631 
 784 F.2d 654 (CA5 1986) 
 Andover Bulletin, Winter 2001/2002
 Among Insurgents; https://www.facebook.com/video/video.php?v=10150414241090394; 
 https://www.facebook.com/ video/video.php?v=10150414590480394
 National Review Online https://web.archive.org/web/20010806153925/http://www.nationalreview.com/weekend/books/books-hayes072801.shtml 
 Among Insurgents; Palestine Revisited, New Horizon, 15 October 1988
 https://www.facebook.com/ video/video.php?v=10150414590480394; Andover Bulletin, Winter 2001/2002
 New York Times, 14 Aug. 1957, http://www.radfilms.com/1957_forbidden_journey_ny_times.htm; Time Magazine, 26 Aug. 1957, ; Andover Bulletin, Winter 2001/2002; http://www.planetarymovement.org/go/newsflash/happy-birthday,-hiroshima-by-shelby-tucker/; Among Insurgents 
 The Last Banana 
 Deccan Chronicle, Chennai, 30 November 2011, http://www.deccanchronicle.com/tabloid/chennai/gypsy-who-home-india-709
 Among Insurgents 
 The Last Banana, Among Insurgents 
 The Last Banana.
 Among Insurgents; The Last Banana 
 The Last Banana 
 Andover Bulletin, Summer 1988
 Among Insurgents 
 Andover Bulletin, Summer 2002
 Commercial Appeal, 1 July 2010, https://web.archive.org/web/20120302224101/http://blogs.commercialappeal.com/the_shelf_life/2010/07/shelby-tucker-comes-home-with-the-last-banana.html
 Deccan Chronicle, Chennai, 30 November 2011, http://www.deccanchronicle.com/tabloid/chennai/gypsy-who-home-india-709
 The Guardian, 3 June 2000
 The Daily Telegraph, 27 May 2000
 Geographical Magazine, Royal Geographical Society, November 2001
 The Sunday Telegraph, 26 November 2001
 The Daily Telegraph, November 11, 2000; The Sunday Telegraph, 26 November 2000; Sunday Times, 26 November 2000; The Scotsman, 30 November 2000; Daily Mail, 29 December 2000; The Times, 7 July 2001
 Among Insurgents (puff)
 The Times Literary Supplement, 27 August 2000
 The Last Banana (puff)
 The Tablet, 24 July 2010, http://www.thetablet.co.uk/review/508
 The Catholic Herald Online, http://www.catholicherald.co.uk/commentandblogs/2011/06/30/my-brief-guide-to-travel-books-the-boring-the-narrow-minded-and-the-brilliant/

American lawyers
American travel writers
Yale University alumni
Alumni of Corpus Christi College, Oxford
People from Ripley, Tennessee
American male non-fiction writers
1935 births
Living people